Aleksin is a town and the administrative center of Aleksinsky District in Tula Oblast, Russia, located  northwest of Tula, the administrative center of the oblast. Population:

History
It was founded at the end of the 13th century and first mentioned in 1348 in the Nikon Chronicle. Aleksin was sacked by Khan Akhmat in 1472 during his invasion of the Grand Duchy of Moscow. Because of its location on the Oka River, it was, for a while, an important inland port. Aleksin was granted town status in 1777. The town expanded in the 1930s with the construction of a chemical plant. During World War II, Aleksin was under German occupation from 29 November 1941 until 17 December 1941.

Administrative and municipal status
Within the framework of administrative divisions, Aleksin serves as the administrative center of Aleksinsky District and is incorporated within it as a town under district jurisdiction. As a municipal division, the town of Aleksin, together with 154 rural localities in Aleksinsky District, is incorporated as Aleksin Urban Okrug.

Twin towns – sister cities

Aleksin is twinned with:

 Saky, Ukraine
 Salihorsk, Belarus
 Tivat, Montenegro
 Veľký Krtíš, Slovakia
 Yevpatoria, Ukraine

Partner cities

 Yelabuga, Russia
 Dimitrovgrad, Russia
 Dzerzhinsky, Russia
 Maloyaroslavets, Russia
 Syzran, Russia
 Susaninsky District, Russia
 Chusovoy, Russia
 Serpukhov, Russia

References

Notes

Sources

External links
Official website of Aleksin 
Directory of organizations in Aleksin 

Cities and towns in Tula Oblast
Aleksinsky Uyezd